Centralismo is a term describing the common act of the social elite in Peru accumulating, or centralizing, wealth and development along the coast of the Pacific Ocean, particularly in the capital city of Lima. This practice has occurred throughout Peru's history and has resulted with large levels of economic inequality, political alienation and other disparities in rural regions, with Lima acquiring the majority of socioeconomic benefits in the nation.

History 
Following the independence of Peru from the Spanish Empire, the economic elite focused their power on the coastal regions while the rural provinces were governed by existing serfdom practices by hacienda landowners. The Government of Peru displayed little interference in the public sector throughout the nation's history since Peru frequently experienced commodities booms that benefitted white elites on the coast, instead of the indigenous majority in rural areas, with businesses focusing on bringing commodities from inland Peru to export on the coast.

As globalization intensified through the twentieth century, distances between urban and rural areas increased, with larger cities increasing their ability to connect to the economy and increasing their wealth while smaller cities experienced resource and human capital flight to larger cities. When Fernando Belaúnde won the 1963 Peruvian general election, with his government making modest improvements by increasing industrialization and constructing highways into the Andes. Belaúnde held a doctrine called "The Conquest of Peru by Peruvians", which promoted the exploitation of resources in the Amazon and other outlying areas of Peru through conquest.

Many Peruvians in rural areas were not able to vote until 1979 when the constitution allowed illiterate individuals to vote, with eleven of eighteen democratically elected presidents of Peru being from Lima between 1919 and 2021. The wealth earned between 1990 and 2020 was not distributed throughout the country; living standards showed disparities between the more-developed capital city of Lima and similar coastal regions while rural provinces remained impoverished.

During the 2021 Peruvian general election, the candidacy of Pedro Castillo brought attention to the centralismo divide, with much of his support being earned in the exterior regions of the country. In May 2021, Americas Quarterly wrote: "Life expectancy in Huancavelica, for example, the region where Castillo received his highest share of the vote in the first round, is seven years shorter than in Lima. In Puno, where Castillo received over 47% of the vote, the infant mortality rate is almost three times that of Lima's." The existing disparities in Peru caused a "globalization fatigue" according to Asensio, resulting in a polarization between rural and urban areas that saw differing priorities with lifestyle, economics and politics. Asensio writes that Castillo, being recognized as a "true Peruvian" by his supporters, was able to capitalize on the "globalization fatigue" sentiments shared by the rural population and establish support by saying he would reverse the favoritism of Lima and defending regional rights. This divide created by centralismo would be a factor contributing towards the 2022–2023 Peruvian protests.

Effects 
Centralismo prevented development in Peru, hampering progressivism movements and making the establishment of a national economy impossible. It also contributed to systemic racism in Peru since the wealth and education centralized in Lima created a perception amongst Limeños that rural indigenous individuals were inferior. Younger and more mobile individuals moved from rural regions to Lima as well, contributing to slower development in the outlying province among an aging population.

Analysis 
Centralismo has been described as "one of the structural evils that accompanied the Republic from its inception to the present", with the disparities between the provinces and Lima being one of the largest examples of income inequality in Latin America. Beginning in the early 1900s, Peruvian intellectuals from the rural provinces began to respond to centralismo by promoting regionalismo, or the spread of development from Lima to the outlying regions. Thorough analysis of the phenomenon began with the Marxist–Leninist philosopher José Carlos Mariátegui in his essay "Regionalism and centralism" of his Seven Interpretive Essays on Peruvian Reality.

In the context of Peru's socioeconomic crisis during the COVID-19 pandemic in Peru, Kahhat stated that "market reforms in Peru have yielded positive results in terms of reducing poverty ... But what the pandemic has laid bare, particularly in Peru, is that poverty was reduced while leaving the miserable state of public services unalteredmost clearly in the case of health services." Some sociologists describe that Peruvian people see that all the natural resources are in the countryside but all the benefits are concentrated mostly in Lima.

See also 
 Lima Consensus

References

Bibliography 

 

Economy of Peru
 
Distribution of wealth
Economic globalization
Social inequality